The International Catholic–Jewish Liaison Committee is a committee formed by the Catholic Church in 1971 to promote reconciliation between the Catholic Church and Jews.

History
The International Catholic–Jewish Liaison Committee has held a number of meetings since its formation as follows:

 8th meeting, 22–25 October 1979 in Regensburg, Germany. The discussions centred on religious freedom and education and for an ongoing dialogue on a pluralistic society. 
 15th meeting, 23–26 May 1994, 15 June 1994 in Jerusalem, Israel.
 16th meeting, 23–26 March 1998, in Vatican City.
 17th meeting, 1–3 May 2001, in New York City.  
 18th meeting, 5–8 July 2004, in Buenos Aires. 
 19th meeting, 4–7 November 2006, in Cape Town, South Africa.
 22nd meeting, 13–16 October 2013, in Madrid, Spain.

See also

 Christian–Jewish reconciliation
 Interfaith dialogue

References

Catholicism and Judaism
Christian organizations established in 1971
Jewish interfaith organizations
Jewish organizations established in 1971